Point Leamington is a town of about 590 people located north of Botwood and Grand Falls-Windsor in the Canadian province of Newfoundland and Labrador.

Demographics 

References

Towns in Newfoundland and Labrador